Alessandro Cortinovis (born 25 January 2001) is an Italian professional footballer who plays as an attacking midfielder for  club Cosenza, on loan from Atalanta.

Club career 
Alessandro Cortinovis made his professional debut for Reggina 1914 on 11 September 2021.

On 22 July 2022, Cortinovis joined Serie A club Hellas Verona on a season-long loan. Having found limited game time, he was recalled by Atalanta: on 14 January 2023, he was subsequently loaned out to  side Cosenza until the end of the season.

References

External links

2001 births
Footballers from Bergamo
Living people
Italian footballers
Italy under-21 international footballers
Italy youth international footballers
Association football forwards
Reggina 1914 players
Hellas Verona F.C. players
Cosenza Calcio players

Serie B players